Baraga State Park is a public recreation area covering  on the shore of Lake Superior's Keweenaw Bay in Baraga County, Michigan. The state park sits along Route 41 on the south side of the village of Baraga. The park, village, and county bear the name of Bishop Frederic Baraga.

Activities and amenities
The park offers swimming, fishing, paddling, picnicking facilities, camping, nature trail, ungroomed cross-country skiing, snowmobiling, playground, and metal detecting.

References

External links
Baraga State Park Michigan Department of Natural Resources
Baraga State Park Map Michigan Department of Natural Resources

State parks of Michigan
Protected areas of Baraga County, Michigan
Protected areas established in 1922
1922 establishments in Michigan
IUCN Category III